These Things Happen Too is the sixth studio album by American rapper G-Eazy. It was released on September 24, 2021 through RCA Records. The album serves as the sequel to his third studio album, These Things Happen (2014). The production on the album was handled by multiple producers including Hit-Boy, Cardiak, OG Parker, Dakari and Hitmaka among others. The album also features guest appearances from Lil Wayne, YG, Goody Grace, E-40, DaBoii, ShooterGang Kony, Demi Lovato, Marc E. Bassy, Ty Dolla Sign, Kossisko, Matt Shultz, and Anthony Hamilton, while its deluxe edition features guest appearances from Tay Keith, EST Gee, Tory Lanez, Tyga, Chris Brown, Mark Morrison, Jack Harlow, Blackbear, and Ant Clemons.

Background
About the album, G-Eazy said that "you live and you learn" about relationships within the project. It is a sequel to his 2014 debut album These Things Happen.

Release and promotion
On September 8, 2021, G-Eazy revealed the album's release date and released a song and teaser video, both titled "The Announcement", as part of its promotion.  Exactly two weeks later, on September 22, 2021, he revealed the tracklist and producer credits. Two singles preceded the release of the album. The lead single, "Running Wild (Tumblr Girls 2)", featuring American singer Kossisko, was released on August 18, 2021. The second single, "Breakdown", featuring American singer Demi Lovato, was released on September 17, 2021.

Reception 
Writing for Pitchfork, David Drake described the album as "well-crafted and considered" but felt that "there’s a better album somewhere inside of [G-Eazy]." Tim Hoffman of Riff Magazine said that "While These Things Happen Too delivers plenty of songs that perpetuate the 'player' criticisms lobbed at G-Eazy [...] there’s plenty of substance to be found as well."

Commercial performance
These Things Happen Too debuted at number 19 on the US Billboard 200 with 19,400 album equivalent units in its first week.

Track listing

Charts

Certifications

References

 

2021 albums
G-Eazy albums
RCA Records albums
Albums produced by Hit-Boy
Albums produced by Hitmaka
Sequel albums